"Sommaräng" ("Summer meadow") is a song written by Swedish singer and composer John Holm, that was the first single released from Marie Fredriksson's 2006 cover album Min bäste vän. It was the only commercial single released off the album.

It spent 13 weeks in the Swedish Singles Chart, peaking at #8 in the first week.

No video was ever shot for the song. However, Marie made a guest appearance in two TV shows where "Sommaräng" was performed: 'TV-huset' (May 14, 2006) and 'Bingolotto' (June 5, 2006).

Formats and track listings
Swedish CD single
(0946 3657482 0; May 17, 2006)
"Sommaräng" (John Holm) - 3:28
"Små lätta moln" (Small light clouds) (Pugh Rogefeldt) - 1:42

Personnel
Marie Fredriksson – vocals
Mikael Bolyos – keyboards, programming, producer, arranger, recording
Ola Gustavsson – guitar
Roger Krieg – mixing
Thomas Eberget – mastering
Mattias Edwall – photography
Kjell Andersson – artwork
Pär Wickholm – artwork
Petra Cabbe – makeup

Chart positions

Marie Fredriksson version

References

2006 singles
Marie Fredriksson songs
Swedish-language songs